Jens Grahl (born 22 September 1988) is a German footballer who plays as a goalkeeper for Bundesliga club Eintracht Frankfurt.

Club career
Grahl joined 1899 Hoffenheim in 2009 from SpVgg Greuther Fürth. During the 2011–12 season he was on loan to SC Paderborn 07. He made his Bundesliga debut at 7 December 2013 against Eintracht Frankfurt in a 1–2 away win.

For the 2016–17 season Grahl moved to VfB Stuttgart. On 14 May 2018, he extended his contract with Stuttgart until June 2020.

On 19 July 2021, Grahl signed a three-year contract with Eintracht Frankfurt.

References

External links
 

1988 births
Living people
Footballers from Stuttgart
SpVgg Greuther Fürth players
TSG 1899 Hoffenheim players
TSG 1899 Hoffenheim II players
SC Paderborn 07 players
VfB Stuttgart players
Eintracht Frankfurt players
Bundesliga players
UEFA Europa League winning players
Association football goalkeepers
German footballers